Dickens is a city in Clay County, Iowa, United States. The population was 146 in the 2020 census, a decline from 202 in 2000.

History
Dickens was founded in 1886.

Geography
Dickens' longitude and latitude coordinates in decimal form are 43.130811, -95.020685.

Demographics

2010 census
As of the census of 2010, there were 185 people, 72 households, and 52 families residing in the city. The racial makeup of the city was 98.4% White, 0.5% Asian, and 1.1% from other races. Hispanic or Latino of any race were 1.1% of the population.

There were 72 households, of which 31.9% had children under the age of 18 living with them, 54.2% were married couples living together, 12.5% had a female householder with no husband present, 5.6% had a male householder with no wife present, and 27.8% were non-families. 20.8% of all households were made up of individuals, and 9.7% had someone living alone who was 65 years of age or older. The average household size was 2.57 and the average family size was 3.02.

The median age in the city was 37.8 years. 24.9% of residents were under the age of 18; 9.2% were between the ages of 18 and 24; 23.8% were from 25 to 44; 28.1% were from 45 to 64; and 14.1% were 65 years of age or older. The gender makeup of the city was 53.0% male and 47.0% female.

2000 census
As of the census of 2000, there were 202 people, 74 households, and 58 families residing in the city. The racial makeup of the city was 97.52% White, 1.49% Asian, and 0.99% from two or more races.

There were 74 households, out of which 36.5% had children under the age of 18 living with them, 75.7% were married couples living together, 2.7% had a female householder with no husband present, and 20.3% were non-families. 16.2% of all households were made up of individuals, and 6.8% had someone living alone who was 65 years of age or older. The average household size was 2.73 and the average family size was 3.10.

In the city, the population was spread out, with 29.2% under the age of 18, 4.0% from 18 to 24, 30.2% from 25 to 44, 25.2% from 45 to 64, and 11.4% who were 65 years of age or older. The median age was 39 years. For every 100 females, there were 92.4 males. For every 100 females age 18 and over, there were 110.3 males.

The median income for a household in the city was $44,167, and the median income for a family was $43,750. Males had a median income of $26,786 versus $20,515 for females. The per capita income for the city was $13,344. About 7.7% of families and 4.5% of the population were below the poverty line, including 4.4% of those under the age of eighteen and none of those 65 or over.

Education
Dickens is within the Spencer Community School District. It was previously in the South Clay Community School District; on July 1, 2010 that district dissolved, with a portion going to the Spencer district.

References

External links

 
City-Data Comprehensive statistical data and more about Dickens

Cities in Iowa
Cities in Clay County, Iowa